The Vermilion Valley Railroad  is a  short-line railroad that operates across the Indiana-Illinois state line, connecting the Flex-N-Gate Corporation facility west of Covington, Indiana with CSX Transportation in Danville, Illinois. The line is owned by the FNG Logistics Company , a subsidiary of auto parts manufacturer Flex-N-Gate, its primary customer. Operations by the VVRR, owned by the Indiana Boxcar Corporation until 2019 and the Midwest and Bluegrass Rail since, began in 2003 after CSX abandoned the ex-New York Central Railroad line.

History
The line was completed in 1869 by the Indianapolis, Crawfordsville and Danville Railroad, and later became part of the Pekin-Indianapolis line of the Peoria and Eastern Railway, a New York Central Railroad subsidiary. Successor Conrail abandoned the portion between Olin and Crawfordsville by 1985, and in 1999 the remaining pieces were conveyed to New York Central Lines LLC for operation by CSX. CSX filed with the Surface Transportation Board for abandonment between Danville and Olin in 2001, since there had been no traffic for the past three years. Flex-N-Gate Corporation submitted an offer of financial assistance and bought the line through newly created FNG Logistics Corporation in December 2002. The Vermilion Valley Railroad began operating the line in April 2003.

Locomotive roster

References

External links

Indiana Boxcar Corporation: Vermilion Valley Railroad

Illinois railroads
Indiana railroads
Transportation in Vermilion County, Illinois
Transportation in Vermillion County, Indiana
Transportation in Warren County, Indiana
Switching and terminal railroads
Spin-offs of CSX Transportation
Railway companies established in 2003
2003 establishments in Illinois
2003 establishments in Indiana